Mad About You is a 1990s American sitcom which had a limited revival in 2019.

Mad About You may also refer to:

Music
 "Mad About You" (Belinda Carlisle song), 1986
 "Mad About You" (Hooverphonic song), 2000
 "Mad About You" (Sting song), 1991
 "Mad About You", a song by Toto from Mindfields, 1999

Television and film
 Mad About You (Chinese TV series), a 2016 sitcom
 Mad About You (film), a 1990 film starring Claudia Christian